Bradley Whitford (born October 10, 1959) is an American actor and producer. He is best known for his portrayal of White House Deputy Chief of Staff Josh Lyman in the NBC television political drama The West Wing (1999–2006), for which he was nominated for three consecutive Primetime Emmy Awards from 2001 to 2003, winning in 2001. The role earned him three consecutive Golden Globe Award nominations.

In addition to The West Wing, Whitford played Danny Tripp in Studio 60 on the Sunset Strip, Dan Stark in the Fox police buddy-comedy The Good Guys, Timothy Carter, a character who was believed to be Red John, in the CBS series The Mentalist, antagonist Eric Gordon in the film Billy Madison, Arthur Parsons in The Post, Dean Armitage in the horror film Get Out, Roger Peralta in Brooklyn Nine-Nine, President Gray in the dystopian science fiction film The Darkest Minds and Rick Stanton in the monster film Godzilla: King of the Monsters.

In 2015, he won a second Primetime Emmy Award for his role as Marcy in Transparent and later garnered a fifth Primetime Emmy Award nomination for portraying Magnus Hirschfeld in the same series. Since 2018, Whitford has portrayed Commander Joseph Lawrence in Hulu dystopian drama The Handmaid's Tale, for which he won his third Primetime Emmy Award in 2019.

Early life
Whitford was born in Madison, Wisconsin, the son of Genevieve Louie (née Smith; 1915–2011) and George Van Norman Whitford (1915–1999). Between the ages of three and fourteen, he lived in Wayne, Pennsylvania. His mother, a poet, later resided in Chestnut Hill, Philadelphia. He grew up in a Quaker household. Whitford graduated from Madison East High School in 1977. He majored in English and theatre at Wesleyan University, graduating with a Bachelor of Arts in 1981, where he was a roommate of producer Paul Schiff. Whitford then studied drama at the Juilliard School, where he was a member of "Group 14".

The NBC series Who Do You Think You Are? explored Whitford's ancestry in an August 2022 episode, including ancestors who fought in a crucial American Civil War battle.

Career
Whitford first appearance on television was in a 1985 episode of The Equalizer followed by a two-year recurring role on the ABC daytime drama All My Children. His film debut was in the 1986 film Dead as a Doorman. He made his Broadway theatre debut in 1990 playing Lt. Jack Ross (followed a few months later in the lead role of Lt. Daniel Kaffee), in the Aaron Sorkin written play A Few Good Men. This was the beginning of a recurring working relationship between Whitford and Sorkin. Whitford made a guest appearance on ER in the episode "Love's Labor Lost".

Whitford joined the cast of Sorkin's The West Wing as Josh Lyman with the show's premiere in 1999. For his role, he won an Emmy Award in 2001 for Best Supporting Actor in a Drama Series. Whitford also wrote two episodes of the series ("Faith Based Initiative" in the sixth season and "Internal Displacement" in the seventh). After The West Wing ended in May 2006, Whitford appeared in Sorkin's later series Studio 60 on the Sunset Strip playing the role of Danny Tripp. He appeared in the British drama Burn Up on the BBC in July 2008.

He starred in the play Boeing-Boeing which opened on Broadway on May 4, 2008. He co-starred in the Joss Whedon/Drew Goddard horror film The Cabin in the Woods, filmed in 2009 but not released until April 2012. In 2010, Whitford starred as Dan Stark in the Fox TV comedy The Good Guys opposite Colin Hanks. In 2011, Whitford guest-starred in In Plain Sight on USA Network as a man combatting paranoia. He appeared in the season three finale of The Mentalist as a minion of and decoy for "Red John", the long-sought nemesis of the show's protagonist Patrick Jane. Whitford appeared on Law & Order: Los Angeles as a lawyer. On September 15, 2011, he starred in the one-night-only staged reading of 8, a play that chronicles the trial surrounding California's Proposition 8, written by Dustin Lance Black.

In 2013, Whitford played Pete Harrison in the ABC comedy Trophy Wife, which was canceled after one season. In 2014, Whitford appeared in a recurring role as a cross-dressing businessman during the first season of the Amazon Studios series Transparent. He went on to win the Primetime Emmy Award for Outstanding Guest Actor in a Comedy Series for his performance. He returned during the series' second season as Magnus Hirschfeld. Since 2015, Whitford has had a recurring role in Brooklyn Nine-Nine as Roger Peralta, father of lead character Jake Peralta (Andy Samberg). In 2017, Whitford played Dean Armitage, a father and neurosurgeon, in the racially themed horror film Get Out.

In 2018, he joined the cast of the web dystopian tragedy The Handmaid's Tale as Commander Joseph Lawrence, guest starring in the final two episodes of the second season. He won the Primetime Emmy Award for Outstanding Guest Actor in a Drama Series in 2019 for his performance and became the first person to have won the guest acting Emmy Awards for both comedy and drama. He returned as a series regular for the third season and garnered a nomination for the Primetime Emmy Award for Outstanding Supporting Actor in a Drama Series. From 2019 to 2020, he starred in the musical comedy series Perfect Harmony, which ran for one season on NBC.

Personal life
Whitford married actress Jane Kaczmarek in August 1992. They have three children together: Frances Genevieve (born October 1997), George Edward (born December 1999), and Mary Louisa (born November 2002). In June 2009, the couple announced that they were divorcing after 16 years of marriage, and the divorce was finalized in October 2010.

Whitford began dating his Transparent co-star Amy Landecker in 2015. They announced their engagement in March 2018. Whitford and Landecker eloped on July 17, 2019.

In May 2007, Whitford was honored by Alliance for Justice, a nonprofit organization, as the 2007 Champion of Justice. He was the keynote speaker for Class Day at Princeton University in June 2007. As of 2012, Whitford serves on the Board of Trustees of his alma mater, Wesleyan University.

Political views and activism
Whitford has been described as having "liberal views". He contributed to The Huffington Post as a columnist. He serves on the Board of Advisors of Let America Vote, an organization founded by former Missouri Secretary of State Jason Kander that aims to end voter suppression. He serves on the advisory board of Citizens' Climate Lobby, an international grassroots environmental group founded by Marshall L. Saunders that trains and supports volunteers to build relationships with their elected representatives in order to influence climate policy.

In 2011, Whitford spoke at a protest in his native Madison, Wisconsin, in opposition to Governor Scott Walker's budget repair bill. Prior to the 2012 United States elections, Whitford and Courage Campaign founder, Rick Jacobs, appeared together in a video that elaborated on California's Proposition 30 and Proposition 32; the video encouraged viewers to vote "yes" on the former and "no" on the latter. Leading up to the 2014 Wisconsin gubernatorial election, Whitford visited multiple University of Wisconsin System campuses in support of nominee Mary Burke, who went on to lose against incumbent Governor Scott Walker. Whitford supported Hillary Clinton in the 2016 United States presidential election. He has been a vocal critic of former US President Donald Trump.

In 2019, he co-hosted a fundraiser for Democratic presidential candidate Pete Buttigieg alongside actress Gwyneth Paltrow as well as donated to Buttigieg's 2020 presidential campaign. That same year, Whitford appeared in a public service announcement in support of abortion rights alongside other cast members of The Handmaid's Tale. The following year, he appeared as part of a series of "surprise virtual appearances" in support of Joe Biden's 2020 presidential campaign.

Filmography

Film

Television

Awards and nominations

References

External links

 
 
 
 Transcript of Whitford's address at the University of Wisconsin's Spring commencement (posted May 17, 2004)
 2001 NPR Interview

1959 births
20th-century American male actors
21st-century American male actors
Actors from Madison, Wisconsin
American activists
American Quakers
American male film actors
American male stage actors
American male television actors
American male voice actors
California Democrats
HuffPost writers and columnists
Juilliard School alumni
Living people
Male actors from Wisconsin
Male actors from Pennsylvania
Madison East High School alumni
Outstanding Performance by a Supporting Actor in a Drama Series Primetime Emmy Award winners
Pennsylvania Democrats
People from San Marino, California
Primetime Emmy Award winners
Wesleyan University alumni
Wisconsin Democrats